The 2019–20 Phoenix Suns season was their 52nd season of the franchise in the National Basketball Association (NBA), as well as their 27th season at the Talking Stick Resort Arena, later being considered the last season playing under that name. At the conclusion of their previous season, the Suns made James Jones the team's permanent general manager, with co-interim general manager Trevor Bukstein returning to his prior assistant general manager role. With a 19–63 season over, their entire coaching staff, including head coach Igor Kokoškov, was dismissed on April 23, 2019. After a quick head coaching search, the Suns hired former New Orleans Hornets/Pelicans head coach and Philadelphia 76ers assistant coach Monty Williams as the team's new head coach on May 3, later completing their new coaching staff on June 26. After the first seven games, despite an early 25-game long suspension to star center Deandre Ayton, the Suns had their best start to a season since the 2013–14 season, and best point differential since the 2004–05 season.

The season was suspended by the league officials following the games completed on March 11 after it was reported that Rudy Gobert (and a referee by proxy) tested positive for COVID-19. During that time, the Suns put up their best record in the last five seasons at 26–39. The suspension continued all the way until July 30, with the NBA agreeing to reopen the league under a modified system behind closed doors for the best 22 teams (including the Suns) this season through a 29-1 majority vote by the NBA and a unanimous vote by the NBPA. The Suns had a shot to advance to the playoffs for the first time since the 2009-10 NBA season by reaching the Western Conference's 8th seed via this season's play-in tournament as a Seed 9 and winning the tournament there. However, their chances before that point were hurt with not only Kelly Oubre Jr. announcing he would no longer play for the rest of the season, but two other Suns players (later revealed to be Aron Baynes and Ricky Rubio, though it eventually turned into four or five different players) later confirmed to test positive for COVID-19 before the season resumed. Despite playing without key players Kelly Oubre Jr. and Aron Baynes in the resumed season, the Suns won all 8 games in the 2020 NBA Bubble, not only being the only undefeated team in the NBA bubble, but also reaching the 30-win barrier for the first time since the 2014–15 season. Still, despite them going undefeated there (having their best winning streak to end a season ever at 8 wins in a row), they would miss the playoffs for a decade straight due to the Memphis Grizzlies having the tiebreaker over Phoenix after beating the Oklahoma City Thunder and Milwaukee Bucks there, as well as the Portland Trail Blazers barely making it as the new Seed 8 of the play-in tournament, winning 134–133 over the Brooklyn Nets.

Off-season

Front office changes
After the conclusion of the team's prior season, the Suns named James Jones their permanent general manager after serving as a coinciding interim general manager with Trevor Bukstein during the previous season. Bukstein was moved back to his original assistant general manager role by that time, while Jeff Bower became the senior vice president of basketball operations. On April 30, 2019, the Suns announced the departure of long-standing athletic trainer and senior vice president of athlete health and performance Aaron Nelson. Nelson left the Suns to be the new head athletic trainer for the New Orleans Pelicans, reuniting with David Griffin and Alvin Gentry there. Starting with this season, Nelson's position was replaced by a newly created sports medicine and performance team. The position was headlined by Brady Howe as the senior director of player health and performance, with David Crewe being the director of medical services and head athletic trainer.

During the regular season, Arizona Cardinals wide receiver Larry Fitzgerald also joined the front office as a partial owner, business and basketball adviser for the Suns, as well as a player adviser for both the Suns and Phoenix Mercury on January 22, 2020. On July 31, days after the Phoenix Suns announced the sale of their NBA G League affiliate Northern Arizona Suns franchise to the Detroit Pistons, the Phoenix Suns franchise also confirmed that around 30 different employees involved with the franchise were laid off for varying reasons. Those reasons for their layoffs ranged from being redundant to being outdated to impacting the franchise's performance as a whole. The timing of their layoffs were also considered not related to any of the renovations for the Talking Stick Resort Arena, any plans for building their new practice facility nearby the arena, or even the impact that the COVID-19 pandemic caused upon the world.

Coaching changes
On April 22, 2019, the Suns fired head coach Igor Kokoškov after only one season with the team, despite giving him a three-year deal, later firing the rest of the coaching staff the following day. After this period, the Suns interviewed former New Orleans Hornets/Pelicans head coach and Philadelphia 76ers assistant coach Monty Williams and Portland Trail Blazers assistant coaches Nate Tibbetts and David Vanterpool. Monty Williams agreed to a five-year deal to coach the Suns on May 3, which became effective on May 12 at the conclusion of the 76ers' playoff run against the eventual 2019 NBA Finals champions, the Toronto Raptors. After a lengthy interviewing process with multiple assistant coach candidates, the Suns announced their new coaching staff on June 26, with Willie Green of the Golden State Warriors, Darko Rajaković and Mark Bryant of the Oklahoma City Thunder, Brooklyn Nets scout Randy Ayers, Larry Greer of the Minnesota Timberwolves, and Portland Trail Blazers on-court assistant Steve Blake being named assistant coaches; Gonzaga University's director of analysis Riccardo Fois and Philadelphia 76ers player development specialist Ben Strong were also named player development coaches.

On July 16, 2020, during the team's stay in Orlando, Florida for the resumed season, the Suns released an updated coaching staff for the franchise during not just the rest of this season, but also intended for entering their next season as well. In this updated coaching staff, the Suns confirmed the official firings of both Steve Blake and Larry Greer from the team. Both coaches were laid off sometime between June 1, the time where the NBA's coaches made their stand on the murder of George Floyd, and July 7, the beginning of their official trip out to Orlando for the rest of their season. Furthermore, the Suns also announced the promotion of Riccardo Fois to being the director of player development, as well as the hiring of both Ryan Frazier as head video coordinator and former Austin Spurs and San Antonio Spurs assistant coach William Donovan III as the assistant video coordinator. Despite the sudden change before the restart, the Suns still finished their restart with a perfect run in the resumed season.

Draft

Entering the night of the 2019 NBA draft, the Suns held just one first-round pick and one second-round pick. With the new lottery projections, the Suns were one of three teams with the best overall odds for a top-4 pick alongside the New York Knicks and Cleveland Cavaliers. Due to them having a tied record with the Cavaliers at the end of last season, a tiebreaker coin-flip to determine which team acquired the second-best odds for a top pick in the draft was held. The Suns lost the tiebreaker, resulting in them getting the third-best odds at #1 with a chance to fall as far back as pick #7. The tiebreaker also flipped for the second-round picks; Phoenix received the #32 pick while the Philadelphia 76ers via Cleveland received the #33 pick. At the night of the draft lottery, the Suns fell to #6, the furthest a team with the third-best odds had fallen in the NBA draft lottery as of this season, as well as the worst drop-off a team with less than 20 wins received after a season. Phoenix also held a chance to acquire the Milwaukee Bucks' first-round pick the prior season, though it would not be acquired via the Bucks having the best regular-season record that season.

On draft night, the Suns agreed to three separate trades, each involving different teams, which were all made official on July 6, 2019. The first trade involved trading small forward T. J. Warren to the Indiana Pacers and their second-round pick of the draft (which became small forward KZ Okpala of Stanford University) to the Miami Heat for cash considerations from Indiana for the purpose of opening up their salary cap in free agency. Their second trade had the Suns trade the 6th pick of the draft (which became shooting guard Jarrett Culver from Texas Tech University) to the Minnesota Timberwolves in exchange for power forward Dario Šarić and Minnesota's own first-round pick at #11. That selection became forward Cameron Johnson from the University of North Carolina, who became an All-ACC First Team member in the 2018–19 season. Johnson later became an efficient bench player for most of the season before performing as a capable starting power forward in the 2020 NBA Bubble. With their final trade, the Suns agreed to trade away the Milwaukee Bucks' future first-round pick (which was the 30th pick of next season's draft) to the Boston Celtics in exchange for center Aron Baynes and the 24th pick of the draft (which was earlier owned by the Philadelphia 76ers), point guard Ty Jerome from the University of Virginia. Jerome was an All-ACC Third Team member in 2018 before being an All-ACC Second Team member in 2019 and winning the 2019 NCAA tournament with Virginia. They also agreed to a partially guaranteed deal with Brewster Academy postgraduate student Jalen Lecque after the draft as an undrafted player, signing his deal alongside the other rookies on July 6, 2019.

Free agency

For this season, free agency began on June 30, 2019 at 6:00 P.M. EST instead of the previously typical July 1 at midnight EST period. Players Dragan Bender (through being declined his fourth-year team option), Jamal Crawford, Troy Daniels, and Richaun Holmes all became unrestricted free agents as of the end of the 2018–19 NBA season, while Kelly Oubre Jr. became a restricted free agent. In addition, both Jimmer Fredette and Ray Spalding held non-guaranteed second seasons with the team, while Tyler Johnson held a player option for this season. Tyler Johnson exercised his player option on June 21, while Jimmer Fredette and Ray Spalding were not guaranteed a second year with the team on June 24 and 29, respectively, though Spalding still played with the Suns during the 2019 NBA Summer League, while Fredette played for the Golden State Warriors there. George King also had a two-way contract that expired this season, though he played for the Utah Jazz's Summer League team instead.

On June 30, Utah Jazz point guard Ricky Rubio agreed to a three-year deal worth $51 million to become the Suns' newest starting point guard, which was signed on July 8. The next day, both Troy Daniels and Richaun Holmes agreed to new deals to join the Los Angeles Lakers and Sacramento Kings, respectively. Charlotte Hornets power forward/center Frank Kaminsky III also agreed to a two-year deal worth $10 million later that day, which was later signed on July 17. On July 3, the Suns agreed to trade Josh Jackson, De'Anthony Melton, and two second-round picks to the Memphis Grizzlies for guards Kyle Korver and Jevon Carter, with Korver being waived on July 8. On July 6, the Suns signed undrafted Brewster Academy point guard Jalen Lecque to a partially guaranteed four-year deal (first two seasons fully guaranteed). Four days later, Kelly Oubre Jr. agreed to a two-year extension worth $30 million to return with the team, which he signed on July 16. On July 15, Jimmer Fredette signed with the Panathinaikos B.C. in Greece. The next day (which was also Kelly Oubre Jr.'s signing day), the Suns agreed to a two-year, $3.5 million deal with former New Orleans Pelicans power forward Cheick Diallo, which he signed on July 23, and a two-way contract spot with Auburn University point guard Jared Harper, which he signed on August 3. On July 21, George King signed a multi-year deal with the Dolomiti Energia Trento in Italy. Dragan Bender later agreed to a partially guaranteed two-year deal with the Milwaukee Bucks on July 25, officially signing with the Bucks on July 30. Ray Spalding also agreed to a non-guaranteed deal with the Atlanta Hawks a day later on July 31, though he was waived before the preseason even concluded on October 8, 2019. Spalding then signed with the Houston Rockets on October 10, 2019 before being waived after the preseason on the 19th and playing for the Rio Grande Valley Vipers in the NBA G League until he later signed a two-way contract with the Charlotte Hornets and Greensboro Swarm in early 2020. The only player that did not sign a new deal in the initial season was Jamal Crawford; he did not sign with any NBA team before the COVID-19 pandemic, but he did sign with the Brooklyn Nets inside the 2020 NBA Bubble out in Orlando as a replacement player for Spencer Dinwiddie on July 9, 2020 under their resumed season despite his signing being after the brief signing period of June 22-July 1, 2020. However, Crawford only played in one game for his 20th season in the NBA before getting injured and later being ruled out for the rest of the season.

On September 27, 2019, the Phoenix Suns announced the signing of Auburn point guard Jared Harper on a two-way contract, as well as the training camp signings of Texas Tech forwards Tariq Owens and Norense Odiase and Ratiopharm Ulm guard David Krämer, a born Slovak raised in Austria that competitively represents Germany. They later waived Owens, Odiase, and Krämer (the last of whom was injured during training camp) from the team after the conclusion of their preseason on October 15. The Suns also signed and waived forwards Aaron Epps and Troy Williams on October 19. Every player except for Williams later played for the Northern Arizona Suns afterward, with Troy playing for the U.S. Victoria Libertas Pallacanestro in Italy's Lega Basket Serie A. Owens eventually signed a two-way contract to return with the Phoenix Suns properly on January 15, 2020. After failing to find a deal for Tyler Johnson during the trade deadline, he was waived from the team on February 10. Johnson was later replaced by former Philadelphia 76ers power forward Jonah Bolden on a 10-day contract two days later. However, Bolden was not renewed for another 10-day contract by February 24 and did not sign with another team during this season, either before or after COVID-19 suspended this season. During the 2019–20 NBA season suspension caused by the COVID-19 pandemic, the Suns waived Jared Harper's two-way contract on March 14, noting the eventual cancellation of the 2019–20 NBA G League season as a consideration for him. However, because his waiver was first announced on the day after the season was first suspended, his waiver was not regarded as official until June 23.

When the NBA announced their plans to resume the 2019–20 season, they opened up a brief period from June 22 to July 1, 2020 where teams can expand their rosters to 17 players properly (meaning two-way contracts would play in the 2020 Playoffs due to the aftermath of this season's suspension) if they don't already have enough players to play with during their stay in Orlando, though even teams that aren't competing in Orlando will be able to make similar moves as well. Players signing in the resumed season for this period will only receive either short-term deals for the rest of the season, two-year deals with a minimum salary of 20/177th the value of the veteran's minimum for this season, or a two-way contract if eligible, with teams also eligible to waive players during that time, if necessary. With Tyler Johnson waived after the trade deadline and not yet permanently replaced by Phoenix at the time combined with Jared Harper being waived on June 23 officially, the Suns had a chance to fill up both a regular open spot and an open two-way contract spot for the 2020 NBA Bubble. (Kelly Oubre Jr. was not eligible for replacement due to him being considered out via injury with a chance to recover in time.) While it was reported that the Suns had two of their own players (which were revealed to be Aron Baynes & Ricky Rubio, with later reports expanding the amount to four or five total) tested positive for COVID-19, which made them eligible for substitute players for this season (initially players with 0–3 seasons of NBA experience before later including veteran players as well), these players were ultimately not seriously affected for the resumed season to warrant such players due to them being discovered early in that period of time and were later able to travel to Orlando before the start of the season. On June 30, 2020, the Suns signed point guard Cameron Payne, who last played for the Texas Legends in the NBA G League earlier this season, to a partially (later fully) guaranteed two-year deal worth a total of $2,173,299, with this season's guarantee of $196,288 for the Orlando period being the total veteran's minimum for his fourth season in the NBA for that section of the season. He was the only contract signed for the Suns during that period, opting not to fill up their other two-way contract spot. Tariq Owens, their only remaining two-way contract left for the season, was later confirmed to not join the Suns in Orlando for July & August as well, though he was out for his own personal reasons. None of the 22 teams in the 2020 NBA Bubble required any further substitute players once this season resumed on July 30, 2020.

Roster

Preseason
The preseason schedule was announced on July 29, 2019. Their preseason schedule was the second-shortest preseason in franchise history, behind the lockout shortened 2011–12 season. All home games played under this time were only viewed locally through the team's official website with recording done via Livestream.com, while road games were only available online outside of the team's area, similar to their last few preseasons. However, all games were heard through local radio stations as an alternative. The Suns ended their preseason with a 2–2 record.

|- style="background:#cfc;"
| 1
| October 8
| Minnesota
| 
| Deandre Ayton (18)
| Deandre Ayton (13)
| Devin Booker, Ricky Rubio (5)
| Talking Stick Resort Arena7,593
| 1–0
|- style="background:#fcc;"
| 2
| October 10
| @ Sacramento
| 
| Devin Booker (18)
| Devin Booker (7)
| Ty Jerome (4)
| Golden 1 Center15,385
| 1–1
|- style="background:#cfc;"
| 3
| October 12
| @ Portland
| 
| Kelly Oubre Jr. (19)
| Dario Šarić (8)
| Frank Kaminsky III (8)
| Moda Center18,468
| 2–1
|- style="background:#fcc;"
| 4
| October 14
| Denver
| 
| Frank Kaminsky III (22)
| Frank Kaminsky III (6)
| Ricky Rubio (9)
| Talking Stick Resort Arena8,075
| 2–2

Scrimmage games
On June 16, 2020, the NBA provided a six phase plan for each team competing at the ESPN Wide World of Sports Complex nearby Walt Disney World. For the fifth phase, the 22 teams left competing in Orlando played three scrimmage games behind closed doors against teams living in hotels nearby each other. For the Suns, they competed in games against other teams staying in Disney's Coronado Springs Resort for the month of July, which were the Utah Jazz, Boston Celtics, and the defending champion Toronto Raptors, all in different arenas hosting these teams at the complex. Unlike in the preseason, the three scrimmage games the Suns played in aired live on Fox Sports Arizona as well as local radio stations alongside the rest of the resumed games for the regular season. They also began wearing cloth face masks to protect themselves from catching COVID-19 for safety purposes. Each team's first game in the scrimmage had only 10-minute quarters for 40-minute games instead of the usual 12-minute quarters for 48 minute games due to a combination of easing players back into action and how teams like the Suns did not have everyone arrive initially on their respective dates. Their last game began the experiment of virtual fans seeing the game live due to the temporary setup for the complex under this period, which was to be used for the rest of the season. Phoenix finished their scrimmage games with a 2–1 record, winning their 40-minute game against the Utah Jazz, but losing to Boston and winning against Toronto in their regular, 48-minute matches.

|- style="background:#cfc;"
| 1
| July 23
| @ Utah
| 
| Mikal Bridges (14)
| Deandre Ayton (8)
| Devin Booker, Ty Jerome, Frank Kaminsky III (3)
| HP Field HouseClosed off arena
| 1–0
|- style="background:#fcc;"
| 2
| July 26
| @ Boston
| 
| Devin Booker (17)
| Dario Šarić (8)
| Devin Booker (9)
| Visa Athletic CenterClosed off arena
| 1–1
|- style="background:#cfc;"
| 3
| July 28
| Toronto
| 
| Mikal Bridges (26)
| Deandre Ayton, Devin Booker, Frank Kaminsky III (6)
| Devin Booker (7)
| AdventHealth ArenaClosed off arena
| 2–1

Regular season
On June 7, 2019, the NBA announced that the Suns would play against the San Antonio Spurs on December 14, 2019 at the Mexico City Arena in Mexico City. That game ended in an overtime loss to San Antonio. The NBA later announced the rest of the league's schedule on August 12. After the first game of the season, Deandre Ayton was suspended for 25 games due to diuretic usage. Despite that setback alongside multiple serious injuries to the team, under the original schedule, the Suns put up a 26–39 record for the season, which already was their best record in over five seasons.

On March 11, 2020, the NBA postponed the rest of the regular season, effective after the end of most of the league’s games played that night. This period left most of the regular season games scheduled throughout March and April in jeopardy of cancellation due to the long suspension. The Suns ended their initial season being six games out of the playoffs from that period, just barely qualifying for resumption. On June 4, the NBA agreed to resume the regular season for 22 teams, including the Suns, behind closed doors at the ESPN Wide World of Sports Complex in Orlando, Florida. Each team only received eight new regular season games for late July and early August before a play-in tournament began with the top two teams for Seed 8 being at least four games apart from each other before the already qualified teams went straight into the 2020 NBA playoffs. The NBA revealed every team’s remaining schedules on June 26, with the Suns having a shuffled period of the initial 8 games they originally had against bubble qualified teams from March 14-April 1, 2020 rescheduled for July 31-August 13, 2020.

Every scheduled game the Suns played in the 2020 NBA Bubble (including their game against the Los Angeles Clippers that aired on NBA TV, as well as the last regular season game against the Dallas Mavericks that aired early on TNT, both held at the AdventHealth Arena in the designated bubble area) still aired on Fox Sports Arizona, though their entire broadcasting crew was working remotely in Arizona during these games. The team also started wearing special cloth face masks during the remaining games played this season, as well as wore "Black Lives Matter" t-shirts before games and kneeling down for the national anthem. Every game these 22 teams competed in during this stretch counted for their overall regular season records. They also provided a potential jump up with playoff and draft placements in the 2020 NBA draft in the event the Suns made it to the playoffs properly, though they would not count for any potential impact in the NBA draft lottery for that upcoming draft. With their resumed season, the Suns managed to get a perfect 8–0 return in the 2020 NBA Bubble to end their regular season at 34–39. However, they did not reach the play-in tournament due to the Portland Trail Blazers having a better record and the Memphis Grizzlies having the tiebreaker over Phoenix this season.

Game log

|-style="background:#cfc;"
| 1
| October 23
| Sacramento
| 
| Devin Booker (22)
| Deandre Ayton (11)
| Ricky Rubio (11)
| Talking Stick Resort Arena18,055
| 1–0
|-style="background:#fcc;"
| 2
| October 25
| @ Denver
| 
| Kelly Oubre Jr. (23)
| Frank Kaminsky III (11)
| Ricky Rubio (9)
| Pepsi Center19,557
| 1–1
|-style="background:#cfc;"
| 3
| October 26
| L. A. Clippers
| 
| Devin Booker (30)
| Dario Šarić (10)
| Devin Booker (8)
| Talking Stick Resort Arena15,802
| 2–1
|-style="background:#fcc;"
| 4
| October 28
| Utah
| 
| Devin Booker (21)
| Ricky Rubio (10)
| Ricky Rubio (8)
| Talking Stick Resort Arena14,805
| 2–2
|-style="background:#cfc;"
| 5
| October 30
| @ Golden State
| 
| Aron Baynes (24)
| Aron Baynes (12)
| Aron Baynes, Ricky Rubio (7)
| Chase Center18,064
| 3–2

|-style="background:#cfc;"
| 6
| November 2
| @ Memphis
| 
| Devin Booker (21)
| Dario Šarić (7)
| Ricky Rubio (5)
| FedExForum14,144
| 4–2
|- style="background:#cfc;"
| 7
| November 4
| Philadelphia
| 
| Devin Booker (40)
| Aron Baynes, Ricky Rubio (7)
| Ricky Rubio (10)
| Talking Stick Resort Arena14,285
| 5–2
|- style="background:#fcc;"
| 8
| November 7
| Miami
| 
| Aron Baynes (23)
| Ricky Rubio (11)
| Ricky Rubio (6)
| Talking Stick Resort Arena15,498
| 5–3
|- style="background:#cfc;"
| 9
| November 10
| Brooklyn
| 
| Devin Booker (27)
| Aron Baynes (7)
| Ricky Rubio (12)
| Talking Stick Resort Arena17,290
| 6–3
|- style="background:#fcc;"
| 10
| November 12
| L. A. Lakers
| 
| Devin Booker, Ricky Rubio (21)
| Frank Kaminsky III (9)
| Ricky Rubio (10)
| Talking Stick Resort Arena18,055
| 6–4
|- style="background:#cfc;"
| 11
| November 14
| Atlanta
| 
| Kelly Oubre Jr. (30)
| Kelly Oubre Jr. (7)
| Ricky Rubio (8)
| Talking Stick Resort Arena15,143
| 7–4
|- style="background:#fcc;"
| 12
| November 18
| Boston
| 
| Devin Booker (20)
| Dario Šarić (10)
| Aron Baynes (5)
| Talking Stick Resort Arena15,193
| 7–5
|- style="background:#fcc;"
| 13
| November 19
| @ Sacramento
| 
| Devin Booker (30)
| Kelly Oubre Jr. (8)
| Devin Booker (8)
| Golden 1 Center16,732
| 7–6
|- style="background:#fcc;"
| 14
| November 21
| New Orleans
| 
| Kelly Oubre Jr. (25)
| Mikal Bridges, Kelly Oubre Jr. (6)
| Devin Booker, Élie Okobo (7)
| Talking Stick Resort Arena13,903
| 7–7
|- style="background:#cfc;"
| 15
| November 23
| @ Minnesota
| 
| Devin Booker (35)
| Devin Booker (12)
| Devin Booker (9)
| Target Center17,362
| 8–7
|- style="background:#fcc;"
| 16
| November 24
| @ Denver
| 
| Cheick Diallo (22)
| Dario Šarić (17)
| Devin Booker (5)
| Pepsi Center19,520
| 8–8
|- style="background:#fcc;"
| 17
| November 27
| Washington
| 
| Devin Booker (27)
| Dario Šarić (12)
| Devin Booker, Élie Okobo (8)
| Talking Stick Resort Arena14,123
| 8–9
|- style="background:#fcc;"
| 18
| November 29
| Dallas
| 
| Kelly Oubre Jr. (22)
| Kelly Oubre Jr. (10)
| Ricky Rubio (9)
| Talking Stick Resort Arena18,055
| 8–10

|- style="background:#cfc;"
| 19
| December 2
| @ Charlotte
| 
| Devin Booker, Kelly Oubre Jr. (23)
| Dario Šarić (10)
| Ricky Rubio (13)
| Spectrum Center11,221
| 9–10
|- style="background:#fcc;"
| 20
| December 4
| @ Orlando
| 
| Frank Kaminsky III (23)
| Dario Šarić (6)
| Ricky Rubio (9)
| Amway Center15,176
| 9–11
|- style="background:#cfc;"
| 21
| December 5
| @ New Orleans
| 
| Devin Booker (44)
| Kelly Oubre Jr. (15)
| Ricky Rubio (15)
| Smoothie King Center15,607
| 10–11
|- style="background:#fcc;"
| 22
| December 7
| @ Houston
| 
| Devin Booker (35)
| Dario Šarić (12)
| Ricky Rubio (13)
| Toyota Center18,055
| 10–12
|- style="background:#cfc;"
| 23
| December 9
| Minnesota
| 
| Devin Booker (26)
| Dario Šarić (9)
| Ricky Rubio (14)
| Talking Stick Resort Arena13,230
| 11–12
|- style="background:#fcc;"
| 24
| December 11
| Memphis
| 
| Frank Kaminsky III (24)
| Kelly Oubre Jr. (13)
| Devin Booker (10)
| Talking Stick Resort Arena12,254
| 11–13
|- style="background:#fcc;"
| 25
| December 14
| San Antonio
| 
| Ricky Rubio (25)
| Dario Šarić (17)
| Ricky Rubio (13)
| Mexico City Arena (Mexico City)20,013
| 11–14
|- style="background:#fcc;"
| 26
| December 16
| Portland
| 
| Kelly Oubre Jr. (24)
| Ricky Rubio (11)
| Ricky Rubio (14)
| Talking Stick Resort Arena14,193
| 11–15
|- style="background:#fcc;"
| 27
| December 17
| @ L. A. Clippers
| 
| Kelly Oubre Jr. (19)
| Deandre Ayton (12)
| Ricky Rubio (8)
| Staples Center19,068
| 11–16
|- style="background:#fcc;"
| 28
| December 20
| @ Oklahoma City
| 
| Ricky Rubio (24)
| Dario Šarić (6)
| Ricky Rubio (8)
| Chesapeake Energy Arena18,203
| 11–17
|- style="background:#fcc;"
| 29
| December 21
| Houston
| 
| Kelly Oubre Jr. (26)
| Devin Booker (6)
| Devin Booker (9)
| Talking Stick Resort Arena16,061
| 11–18
|- style="background:#fcc;"
| 30
| December 23
| Denver
| 
| Ricky Rubio (21)
| Ricky Rubio, Cameron Johnson (7)
| Ricky Rubio (9)
| Talking Stick Resort Arena16,041
| 11–19
|- style="background:#fcc;"
| 31
| December 27
| @ Golden State
| 
| Devin Booker (34)
| Aron Baynes, Dario Šarić (10)
| Devin Booker, Ricky Rubio (4)
| Chase Center18,064
| 11–20
|- style="background:#cfc;"
| 32
| December 28
| @ Sacramento
| 
| Devin Booker (32)
| Kelly Oubre Jr. (16)
| Devin Booker (10)
| Golden 1 Center17,583
| 12–20
|- style="background:#cfc;"
| 33
| December 30
| @ Portland
| 
| Devin Booker (33)
| Deandre Ayton (12)
| Ricky Rubio (13)
| Moda Center19,896
| 13–20

|- style="background:#fcc;"
| 34
| January 1
| @ L. A. Lakers
| 
| Devin Booker (32)
| Deandre Ayton (14)
| Ricky Rubio (9)
| Staples Center18,997
| 13–21
|- style="background:#cfc;"
| 35
| January 3
| New York
| 
| Devin Booker (38)
| Deandre Ayton (13)
| Ricky Rubio (10)
| Talking Stick Resort Arena18,055
| 14–21
|- style="background:#fcc;"
| 36
| January 5
| Memphis
| 
| Devin Booker (40)
| Deandre Ayton (12)
| Ricky Rubio (8)
| Talking Stick Resort Arena14,181
| 14–22
|- style="background:#fcc;"
| 37
| January 7
| Sacramento
| 
| Devin Booker (34)
| Deandre Ayton (9)
| Ricky Rubio (9)
| Talking Stick Resort Arena14,134
| 14–23
|- style="background:#cfc;"
| 38
| January 10
| Orlando
| 
| Devin Booker (24)
| Deandre Ayton, Kelly Oubre Jr. (9)
| Ricky Rubio (10)
| Talking Stick Resort Arena14,562
| 15–23
|- style="background:#cfc;"
| 39
| January 12
| Charlotte
| 
| Kelly Oubre Jr. (25)
| Kelly Oubre Jr. (15)
| Devin Booker, Ricky Rubio (9)
| Talking Stick Resort Arena14,751
| 16–23
|- style="background:#fcc;"
| 40
| January 14
| @ Atlanta
| 
| Devin Booker (39)
| Deandre Ayton (10)
| Mikal Bridges (4)
| State Farm Arena16,060
| 16–24
|- style="background:#cfc;"
| 41
| January 16
| @ New York
| 
| Devin Booker (29)
| Deandre Ayton (21)
| Ricky Rubio (13)
| Madison Square Garden18,215
| 17–24
|- style="background:#cfc;"
| 42
| January 18
| @ Boston
| 
| Devin Booker (39)
| Deandre Ayton (15)
| Devin Booker, Ricky Rubio (9)
| TD Garden19,156
| 18–24
|- style="background:#fcc;"
| 43
| January 20
| San Antonio
| 
| Devin Booker (37)
| Deandre Ayton (12)
| Ricky Rubio (9)
| Talking Stick Resort Arena14,847
| 18–25
|- style="background:#fcc;"
| 44
| January 22
| Indiana
| 
| Kelly Oubre Jr. (17)
| Kelly Oubre Jr. (9)
| Devin Booker, Ricky Rubio, Élie Okobo (3)
| Talking Stick Resort Arena14,691
| 18–26
|- style="background:#cfc;"
| 45
| January 24
| @ San Antonio
| 
| Devin Booker (35)
| Deandre Ayton (11)
| Devin Booker (10)
| AT&T Center18,354
| 19–26
|- style="background:#fcc;"
| 46
| January 26
| @ Memphis
| 
| Devin Booker (36)
| Deandre Ayton (15)
| Devin Booker (5)
| FedExForum17,214
| 19–27
|-style="background:#cfc;"
| 47
| January 28
| @ Dallas
| 
| Devin Booker (32)
| Deandre Ayton (9)
| Devin Booker (9)
| American Airlines Center20,216
| 20–27
|- style="background:#fcc;"
| 48
| January 31
| Oklahoma City
| 
| Devin Booker, Kelly Oubre Jr. (27)
| Kelly Oubre Jr. (11)
| Ricky Rubio (7)
| Talking Stick Resort Arena17,260
| 20–28

|- style="background:#fcc;"
| 49
| February 2
| @ Milwaukee
| 
| Devin Booker (32)
| Deandre Ayton (14)
| Devin Booker (6)
| Fiserv Forum17,754
| 20–29
|- style="background:#fcc;"
| 50
| February 3
| @ Brooklyn
| 
| Deandre Ayton (25)
| Deandre Ayton (17)
| Deandre Ayton, Élie Okobo (5)
| Barclays Center14,891
| 20–30
|- style="background:#fcc;"
| 51
| February 5
| @ Detroit
| 
| Kelly Oubre Jr. (30)
| Deandre Ayton (12)
| Ricky Rubio (11)
| Little Caesars Arena13,707
| 20–31
|- style="background:#cfc;"
| 52
| February 7
| Houston
| 
| Kelly Oubre Jr. (39)
| Devin Booker, Kelly Oubre Jr. (9)
| Ricky Rubio (10)
| Talking Stick Resort Arena17,043
| 21–31
|- style="background:#fcc;"
| 53
| February 8
| Denver
| 
| Deandre Ayton (28)
| Deandre Ayton (19)
| Devin Booker (9)
| Talking Stick Resort Arena16,843
| 21–32
|- style="background:#fcc;"
| 54
| February 10
| @ L. A. Lakers
| 
| Mikal Bridges (18)
| Mikal Bridges (6)
| Devin Booker, Ricky Rubio (5)
| Staples Center18,997
| 21–33
|- style="background:#cfc;"
| 55
| February 12
| Golden State
| 
| Devin Booker (27)
| Cheick Diallo (8)
| Ricky Rubio (9)
| Talking Stick Resort Arena15,216
| 22–33
|- align="center"
|colspan="9" bgcolor="#bbcaff"|All-Star Break
|- style="background:#fcc;"
| 56
| February 21
| @ Toronto
| 
| Devin Booker (21)
| Deandre Ayton (10)
| Ricky Rubio (9)
| Scotiabank Arena19,800
| 22–34
|- style="background:#cfc;"
| 57
| February 22
| @ Chicago
| 
| Devin Booker (29)
| Deandre Ayton (19)
| Ricky Rubio (11)
| United Center20,506
| 23–34
|- style="background:#cfc;"
| 58
| February 24
| @ Utah
| 
| Devin Booker (24)
| Aron Baynes (8)
| Ricky Rubio (11)
| Vivint Smart Home Arena18,306
| 24–34
|- style="background:#fcc;"
| 59
| February 26
| L. A. Clippers
| 
| Deandre Ayton (25)
| Deandre Ayton (17)
| Devin Booker, Ricky Rubio (10)
| Talking Stick Resort Arena15,157
| 24–35
|- style="background:#fcc;"
| 60
| February 28
| Detroit
| 
| Devin Booker (26)
| Deandre Ayton (10)
| Ricky Rubio (13)
| Talking Stick Resort Arena17,142
| 24–36
|- style="background:#fcc;"
| 61
| February 29
| Golden State
| 
| Devin Booker (21)
| Deandre Ayton, Dario Šarić (9)
| Ricky Rubio (8)
| Talking Stick Resort Arena16,395
| 24–37

|- style="background:#fcc;"
| 62
| March 3
| Toronto
| 
| Devin Booker (22)
| Deandre Ayton (14)
| Devin Booker, Ricky Rubio (10)
| Talking Stick Resort Arena15,553
| 24–38
|- style="background:#cfc;"
| 63
| March 6
| Portland
| 
| Aron Baynes (37)
| Aron Baynes (16)
| Devin Booker (12)
| Talking Stick Resort Arena15,522
| 25–38
|- style="background:#cfc;"
| 64
| March 8
| Milwaukee
| 
| Devin Booker (36)
| Ricky Rubio (13)
| Ricky Rubio (13)
| Talking Stick Resort Arena17,282
| 26–38
|- style="background:#fcc;"
| 65
| March 10
| @ Portland
| 
| Devin Booker (29)
| Dario Šarić (11)
| Devin Booker, Ricky Rubio (9)
| Moda Center19,393
| 26–39

|- style="background:#cfc;"
| 66
| July 31
| @ Washington
| 
| Devin Booker (27)
| Deandre Ayton (12)
| Ricky Rubio (9)
| Visa Athletic CenterNo In-Person Attendance
| 27–39
|- style="background:#cfc;"
| 67
| August 2
| Dallas
| 
| Devin Booker (32)
| Cameron Johnson (12)
| Ricky Rubio (7)
| Visa Athletic CenterNo In-Person Attendance
| 28–39
|- style="background:#cfc;"
| 68
| August 4
| @ L. A. Clippers
| 
| Devin Booker (35)
| Dario Šarić (8)
| Devin Booker (8)
| AdventHealth ArenaNo In-Person Attendance
| 29–39
|- style="background:#cfc;"
| 69
| August 6
| Indiana
| 
| Deandre Ayton (23)
| Cameron Johnson (12)
| Devin Booker (10)
| Visa Athletic CenterNo In-Person Attendance
| 30–39
|- style="background:#cfc;"
| 70
| August 8
| @ Miami
| 
| Devin Booker (35)
| Deandre Ayton (12)
| Ricky Rubio (8)
| Visa Athletic CenterNo In-Person Attendance
| 31–39
|- style="background:#cfc;"
| 71
| August 10
| Oklahoma City
| 
| Devin Booker (35)
| Dario Šarić (9)
| Ricky Rubio (9)
| HP Field HouseNo In-Person Attendance
| 32–39
|- style="background:#cfc;"
| 72
| August 11
| @ Philadelphia
| 
| Devin Booker (35)
| Deandre Ayton (12)
| Ricky Rubio (10)
| Visa Athletic CenterNo In-Person Attendance
| 33–39
|- style="background:#cfc;"
| 73
| August 13
| Dallas
| 
| Devin Booker (27)
| Deandre Ayton (9)
| Ricky Rubio (12)
| AdventHealth ArenaNo In-Person Attendance
| 34–39

|- style="background:#bbb;"
| 66
| March 14
| @ Dallas
|
|
|
|
| American Airlines Center
|
|- style="background:#bbb;"
| 67
| March 18
| Minnesota
|
|
|
|
| Talking Stick Resort Arena
|
|- style="background:#bbb;"
| 68
| March 20
| @ L.A. Clippers
|
|
|
|
| Staples Center
|
|- style="background:#bbb;"
| 69
| March 21
| Dallas
|
|
|
|
| Talking Stick Resort Arena
|
|- style="background:#bbb;"
| 70
| March 23
| @ Indiana
|
|
|
|
| Bankers Life Fieldhouse
|
|- style="background:#bbb;"
| 71
| March 25
| @ Washington
|
|
|
|
| Capital One Arena
|
|- style="background:#bbb;"
| 72
| March 27
| @ Philadelphia
|
|
|
|
| Wells Fargo Center
|
|- style="background:#bbb;"
| 73
| March 28
| @ Miami
|
|
|
|
| AmericanAirlines Arena
|
|- style="background:#bbb;"
| 74
| March 30
| @ Cleveland
|
|
|
|
| Rocket Mortgage FieldHouse
|
|- style="background:#bbb;"
| 75
| April 1
| @ Oklahoma City
|
|
|
|
| Chesapeake Energy Arena
|
|- style="background:#bbb;"
| 76
| April 3
| Cleveland
|
|
|
|
| Talking Stick Resort Arena
|
|- style="background:#bbb;"
| 77
| April 5
| Chicago
|
|
|
|
| Talking Stick Resort Arena
|
|- style="background:#bbb;"
| 78
| April 7
| @ Minnesota
|
|
|
|
| Target Center
|
|- style="background:#bbb;"
| 79
| April 9
| @ New Orleans
|
|
|
|
| Smoothie King Center
|
|- style="background:#bbb;"
| 80
| April 11
| Utah
|
|
|
|
| Talking Stick Resort Arena
|
|- style="background:#bbb;"
| 81
| April 13
| @ Houston
|
|
|
|
| Toyota Center
|
|- style="background:#bbb;"
| 82
| April 15
| L.A. Lakers
|
|
|
|
| Talking Stick Resort Arena
|

Standings

Player statistics

Before season suspension

|- style="text-align:center;" bgcolor=""
|
| 30 || 25 || 33.2 || .548 || .000 || .769 || 12.0 || 1.9 || 0.7 || 1.7 || 19.0
|- style="text-align:center;" bgcolor=""
|
| 42 || 28 || 22.2 || .480 || .351 || .747 || 5.6 || 1.6 || 0.2 || 0.5 || 11.5
|- style="text-align:center;" bgcolor=""
|*
| 3 || 0 || 11.0 || .250 || .000 || 1.000 || 2.7 || 0.0 || 0.7 || 0.7 || 2.0
|- style="text-align:center;" bgcolor=""
|
| 62 || 62 || 36.1 || .487 || .360 || .916 || 4.2 || 6.6 || 0.7 || 0.3 || 26.1
|- style="text-align:center;" bgcolor=""
|
| 65 || 24 || 27.3 || .516 || .352 || .848 || 4.0 || 1.8 || 1.4 || 0.6 || 8.7
|- style="text-align:center;" bgcolor=""
|
| 50 || 2 || 15.1 || .400 || .393 || .840 || 2.0 || 1.3 || 0.8 || 0.3 || 4.6
|- style="text-align:center;" bgcolor=""
|
| 44 || 2 || 10.6 || .650 || .500 || .865 || 2.9 || 0.5 || 0.2 || 0.3 || 4.8
|- style="text-align:center;" bgcolor=""
|
| 3 || 0 || 2.7 || .250 || .000 || .000 || 0.0 || 0.0 || 0.0 || 0.0 || 0.7
|- style="text-align:center;" bgcolor=""
|
| 28 || 0 || 11.3 || .349 || .277 || .786 || 1.5 || 1.5 || 0.5 || 0.1 || 3.5
|- style="text-align:center;" bgcolor=""
|
| 49 || 1 || 20.3 || .418 || .397 || .761 || 2.9 || 1.1 || 0.6 || 0.3 || 8.1
|- style="text-align:center;" bgcolor=""
|*
| 31 || 3 || 16.6 || .380 || .389 || .750 || 1.7 || 1.6 || 0.4 || 0.3 || 5.7
|- style="text-align:center;" bgcolor=""
|
| 32 || 13 || 22.4 || .455 || .348 || .670 || 4.9 || 2.2 || 0.4 || 0.3 || 11.0
|- style="text-align:center;" bgcolor=""
|
| 4 || 0 || 6.5 || .400 || .000 || 1.000 || 0.0 || 0.5 || 0.0 || 0.0 || 2.5
|- style="text-align:center;" bgcolor=""
|
| 54 || 3 || 13.1 || .398 || .352 || .687 || 1.6 || 2.1 || 0.4 || 0.1 || 4.0
|- style="text-align:center;" bgcolor=""
|
| 56 || 55 || 34.5 || .452 || .352 || .780 || 6.4 || 1.5 || 1.3 || 0.7 || 18.7
|- style="text-align:center;" bgcolor=""
|
| 3 || 0 || 5.0 || .200 || .000 || 1.000 || 1.0 || 0.0 || 0.3 || 0.0 || 1.3
|- style="text-align:center;" bgcolor=""
|
| 57 || 57 || 31.6 || .412 || .351 || .853 || 4.6 || 8.9 || 1.5 || 0.2 || 13.1
|- style="text-align:center;" bgcolor=""
|
| 58 || 50 || 24.8 || .462 || .341 || .832 || 5.9 || 1.9 || 0.6 || 0.3 || 10.1
|}

* – Stats with the Suns.

After season suspension

|- style="text-align:center;" bgcolor=""
|
| 38 || 32 || 32.5 || .546 || .231 || .753 || 11.5 || 1.9 || 0.7 || 1.5 || 18.2
|- style="text-align:center;" bgcolor=""
|
| 42 || 28 || 22.2 || .480 || .351 || .747 || 5.6 || 1.6 || 0.2 || 0.5 || 11.5
|- style="text-align:center;" bgcolor=""
|*
| 3 || 0 || 11.0 || .250 || .000 || 1.000 || 2.7 || 0.0 || 0.7 || 0.7 || 2.0
|- style="text-align:center;" bgcolor=""
|
| 70 || 70 || 35.9 || .489 || .354 || .919 || 4.2 || 6.5 || 0.7 || 0.3 || 26.6
|- style="text-align:center;" bgcolor=""
|
| 73 || 32 || 28.0 || .510 || .361 || .844 || 4.0 || 1.8 || 1.4 || 0.6 || 9.1
|- style="text-align:center;" bgcolor=""
|
| 58 || 2 || 16.3 || .416 || .425 || .852 || 2.0 || 1.4 || 0.8 || 0.3 || 4.9
|- style="text-align:center;" bgcolor=""
|
| 47 || 2 || 10.2 || .648 || .333 || .872 || 2.8 || 0.5 || 0.2 || 0.3 || 4.7
|- style="text-align:center;" bgcolor=""
|
| 3 || 0 || 2.7 || .250 || .000 || .000 || 0.0 || 0.0 || 0.0 || 0.0 || 0.7
|- style="text-align:center;" bgcolor=""
|
| 31 || 0 || 10.6 || .336 || .280 || .750 || 1.5 || 1.4 || 0.5 || 0.1 || 3.3
|- style="text-align:center;" bgcolor=""
|
| 57 || 9 || 22.0 || .435 || .390 || .807 || 3.3 || 1.2 || 0.6 || 0.4 || 8.8
|- style="text-align:center;" bgcolor=""
|*
| 31 || 3 || 16.6 || .380 || .389 || .750 || 1.7 || 1.6 || 0.4 || 0.3 || 5.7
|- style="text-align:center;" bgcolor=""
|
| 39 || 13 || 19.9 || .450 || .331 || .678 || 4.5 || 1.9 || 0.4 || 0.3 || 9.7
|- style="text-align:center;" bgcolor=""
|
| 5 || 0 || 6.3 || .400 || .000 || 1.000 || 0.4 || 0.4 || 0.0 || 0.0 || 2.0
|- style="text-align:center;" bgcolor=""
|
| 55 || 3 || 13.1 || .398 || .352 || .704 || 1.6 || 2.1 || 0.4 || 0.1 || 4.0
|- style="text-align:center;" bgcolor=""
|
| 56 || 55 || 34.5 || .452 || .352 || .780 || 6.4 || 1.5 || 1.3 || 0.7 || 18.7
|- style="text-align:center;" bgcolor=""
|
| 3 || 0 || 5.0 || .200 || .000 || 1.000 || 1.0 || 0.0 || 0.3 || 0.0 || 1.3
|- style="text-align:center;" bgcolor=""
|**
| 8 || 0 || 22.9 || .485 || .517 || .857 || 3.9 || 3.0 || 1.0 || 0.3 || 10.9
|- style="text-align:center;" bgcolor=""
|
| 65 || 65 || 31.0 || .415 || .361 || .863 || 4.7 || 8.8 || 1.4 || 0.2 || 13.0
|- style="text-align:center;" bgcolor=""
|
| 66 || 51 || 24.7 || .476 || .357 || .844 || 6.2 || 1.9 || 0.6 || 0.2 || 10.7
|}

** – Joined team for their resumed season in the 2020 NBA Bubble.

Awards and records
 On September 6, 2019, former Suns player and coach Paul Westphal was inducted into the Naismith Basketball Hall of Fame as a player.

Awards
 Devin Booker wins the first ever "NBA 2K Players Tournament" over his teammate Deandre Ayton in a best of 3 finals series to become the "NBA 2K20 Players Champion". Booker donated his earnings to both Direct Relief and the Arizona Food Bank Network (which helps all food banks in the state of Arizona) to support relief amidst the COVID-19 pandemic.
 On August 15, 2020, Devin Booker won his first (technically speaking) All-NBA Team honors by being named one of only three unanimous members of the All-Seeding Games First Team, earning his spot with averages of 30.5 points, 4.9 rebounds, and 6 assists per game in the 2020 NBA Bubble. He was also named runner-up for the Seeding Games' MVP behind Damian Lillard.
 Monty Williams was named the Head Coach of the Seeding Games for having an undefeated record in the 2020 NBA Bubble, receiving nearly unanimous first place votes for the honor with their perfect 8–0 record there.

Week/Month

All-Star
 On January 30, 2020, Deandre Ayton was once again named a member of the World Team for the Rising Stars Challenge. However, due to a left ankle injury sustained on February 10, he abstained from playing in the event, being replaced by Nicolò Melli.
 On February 13, 2020, Devin Booker was named an All-Star for the first time in his career, replacing Damian Lillard for both the Three-Point Contest and the 2020 NBA All-Star Game as a member for Team LeBron.
 Booker became the runner-up in the Three-Point Contest for 2020, coming behind Buddy Hield by tying him in the first round, but losing to him by one point in the final round. He also put up six points, four rebounds, and a block coming off the bench with 19 minutes played in Team LeBron's 157–155 win over Team Giannis.

Records
 From December 28, 2019 until January 7, 2020, Devin Booker joined James Harden, Russell Westbrook, LeBron James, and Tracy McGrady as the only players to put up 30+ points and 6+ assists in six straight games, dating back to the 1983–84 NBA season. He also became the only player to shoot at least 47% in each of those games.
 On January 28, 2020, Devin Booker became the youngest (shooting) guard to reach 7,000, breaking a record previously set by Kobe Bryant.
 On March 6, 2020, Aron Baynes became only the second player in league history to score 35+ points with 9 three-pointers made and grab 15+ rebounds in a single game, with the first player being James Harden.
 By the end of the regular season in August, this season's Suns team broke the 1989–90 Boston Celtics' record for highest free-throw percentage in a season at over 83.2% efficiency by shooting their free-throws at an 83.4% efficiency rate. However, the record can be considered one with an asterisk on it due to it not being completed under a full, 82 game schedule via the COVID-19 pandemic.

Team records
 On October 12, 2019, the Suns set a preseason record for most three-pointers made in a single game with 24 made in a win over the Portland Trail Blazers.
 On October 23, 2019, Ricky Rubio tied Elliot Perry as the only players to put up 11 assists in their Suns debut games.
 The 43–14 first quarter the Suns scored for a 29-point lead against the Golden State Warriors on October 30, 2019 became the team's largest lead by the end of a first quarter in franchise history, beating the 24-point lead held against the Utah Jazz back on January 5, 1994.
 On November 5, 2019, Devin Booker became the first player in franchise history to score at least fifteen field goals and 3 three-pointers while making 75% or more of his shot attempts in both areas.
 Throughout the team's first seven games of the season, the Suns scored 89 three-point field goals, breaking a team record set back in the 2009–10 season.
 From December 27, 2019 until January 7, 2020, Devin Booker set the franchise record of 7 consecutive 30+ point games, previously set (and then repeated) at 5 games by Charlie Scott and later tied by Charles Barkley.
 On February 8, 2020, Deandre Ayton became the quickest player in franchise history to reach 1,000 rebounds with 19 grabbed against the Denver Nuggets, getting to that mark in only 94 games played with Phoenix.
 On March 6, 2020, Aron Baynes tied former Suns players Quentin Richardson and Channing Frye for the franchise record of most three-pointers made in a single game.
 On August 6, 2020, Devin Booker became the quickest player in franchise history to reach 200 20-point games for the Suns, reaching that amount in 338 total games played with Phoenix. He reached the 20-point barrier with a three-point play at 4:32 in the fourth quarter in a 114–99 win against the Indiana Pacers as the home team. He also became the sixth youngest player in league history to reach that mark and the fastest Suns player to get 200 20+ point games.
 On August 8, 2020, Cameron Johnson broke a record previously set by Wesley Person for the fastest player to reach 100 three-pointers made in franchise history. He would score a three-pointer in the first quarter that day before ending the night with one more for 101 three-pointers this season in a 119–112 win over the Miami Heat as the road team, breaking Wesley Person's record of 72 games in only 54 games played.
 On August 10, 2020, Devin Booker tied a record previously set by Walter Davis for the most games of 30+ points scored for the Suns with 35 points in a blowout 128–101 win over the Oklahoma City Thunder as the home team.
 A day later, Devin Booker broke the record with another 35-point romp for a 130–117 win over the Philadelphia 76ers as the road team.
 At the end of the season on August 13, Cameron Johnson held the overall pace to become the franchise's record holder for most three-pointers made in their rookie season with 106 total in the shortened season, being on pace to break Wesley Person's record of 116 there properly had the season not been interrupted.

Milestones
 On November 5, 2019, Devin Booker became the eighth-youngest player in NBA history to reach 6,000 points, behind LeBron James, Kevin Durant, Carmelo Anthony, Kobe Bryant, Tracy McGrady, Andrew Wiggins, and Shaquille O'Neal.
 On January 28, 2020, Devin Booker became the fourth-youngest player to reach 7,000 points in the NBA, behind only LeBron James, Kevin Durant, and Carmelo Anthony.
 On February 8, 2020, Deandre Ayton became the fourth-fastest player to reach 1,000 rebounds since 1992, with only Shaquille O'Neal, Blake Griffin, and Tim Duncan being faster than Ayton.
 On August 4, 2020, Devin Booker became the sixth-youngest player to reach 7,500 points behind LeBron James, Kevin Durant, Carmelo Anthony, Kobe Bryant, and Tracy McGrady.

Team milestones
 On November 2, 2019, Devin Booker surpassed former teammate Jared Dudley to be the seventh-highest scoring three-point shooter in franchise history with three three-point field goals made in a win over the Memphis Grizzlies.
 Devin Booker became the 17th player in franchise history to score over 6,000 points for the Suns, scoring 40 points in a win over the Philadelphia 76ers on November 5, 2019.
 Booker then surpassed Neal Walk to become the 16th highest scoring player in franchise history the next game three days later with 22 points scored in a loss to the Miami Heat.
 On December 7, 2019, Devin Booker surpassed Hall of Famer and Phoenix Suns Ring of Honor member Connie Hawkins to become the 15th highest scoring player in franchise history with 35 points scored in a loss to the Houston Rockets.
 Devin Booker later surpassed his (first) rookie season head coach, Jeff Hornacek, on the scoring list only four days later with 15 points scored to then become the 14th highest scorer in franchise history in a loss to the Memphis Grizzlies.
 On December 21, 2019, Devin Booker surpassed his one-time former teammate, Leandro Barbosa, to become the 13th highest scoring player in franchise history with 19 points scored in a loss to the Houston Rockets.
 On December 30, 2019, Devin Booker surpassed Hall of Famer and Phoenix Suns Ring of Honor member Charles Barkley with 33 points scored in a 122–116 win over the Portland Trail Blazers to become the 12th highest scoring player in franchise history.
 On January 10, 2020, Devin Booker tied former power forward/center Channing Frye as the sixth-highest three-point shooter in franchise history with four three-point field goals made in a win over the Orlando Magic.
 Booker then surpassed Frye in the next game just two days later with one made in a win over the Charlotte Hornets.
 Devin Booker became the 12th player in franchise history to score at least 7,000 points for the Phoenix Suns, reaching that point with 32 points (20 scored in the third quarter) in a 133–104 blowout win over the Dallas Mavericks on January 28, 2020.
 On February 7, 2020, Devin Booker surpassed former shooting guard Raja Bell with four three-point shots made in a blowout win over the Houston Rockets to become the fifth-best three-point shooter in franchise history.
 On March 8, 2020, Devin Booker not only tied Amar'e Stoudemire with the second-most 30+ point games in the franchise at 86 behind only Walter Davis at 90, but he also tied former forward Shawn Marion for being the team's fourth-best three-point shooter in a 140–131 win over the Milwaukee Bucks.
 He later surpassed Shawn Marion by the end of their last originally scheduled NBA game played with two three-pointers made two days later against the Portland Trail Blazers, their last game before this season's suspension began.
 On August 2, 2020, Devin Booker reached 87 games of 30+ points with the Suns against the Dallas Mavericks in Orlando, being the official second-highest player in franchise history to score 30+ points in games with Phoenix. That night, he scored 32 before being fouled out of the game in a close 117–115 win over Dallas as the home team.
 On August 4, 2020, Devin Booker tied Walter Davis for the most buzzer-beating, game-winning shots in franchise history with a buzzer-beating two-pointer over both Paul George and Kawhi Leonard in their close 117–115 win over the Los Angeles Clippers as the road team.
 On August 10, 2020, Devin Booker tied Walter Davis for the most 30+ point games with Phoenix, having 90 games with that amount scored (also reaching it with a near half-court three-pointer early in the third quarter) in a blowout 128–101 win over the Oklahoma City Thunder as the home team.
 Booker later broke Walter Davis' record for the most 30+ point games with the Suns a day later, scoring 35 points in a 130–117 win over the Philadelphia 76ers as the road team.

Transactions

Trades

Free agents

Re-Signed

Additions

Subtractions

References

Phoenix
Phoenix Suns seasons
Phoenix Suns
Phoenix Suns